DarkWaters is a metal band that emerged in Portugal, in August 2012, as the result of the union of five musicians.

2012 - 2015
Nine months after their inception, the band had its first public appearance at the "Hard Rock Rising" 2013 contest, where they reached the finals of the Portuguese edition and immediately caused a commotion in the music scene of Portugal with their innovative, powerful and aggressive sound.

Since then DarkWaters have been playing in various events, supported by an ever growing number of fans, mainly due to the release of their first album, "Golden Age of Decadence", in September 2013.

Golden Age of Decadence has been highly acclaimed as a great and unique album for many people in the music industry.

2015 - 

On 14 October 2015, the band released its second album, Odds and Lies.

The band's rhythm guitarist Diogo Cardão stated “ODDS AND LIES is a deeply emotional record for all of us. We're really proud of this work and can't wait to go out on tour and share it with everyone!”

The album was mixed by world renowned producer Daniel Bergstrand at Dugout Studio, in Uppsala, Sweden. His work includes such metal acts as In Flames, Behemoth and Meshuggah. According to Ricardo Falcão, Premiere Music Manager, "We are very enthusiastic about this release, I believe the band did a very special album with great songs and wonderful production!"

Members

Sérgio Lucas – vocals
Jorge Costa – lead guitar
Diogo Cardão – rhythm guitar
Tiago Silva – bass
Filipe Serrano – drums

Discography

Golden Age of Decadence (2013) 

Osiris
As we become one
Pure hate
Dreaming of the abyss
Science of things
Rock it while you can
Forsaken

Odds and Lies (2015) 

Artwork made By Caio Caldas at CadiesArt.

Strongest Of Them All
Departed
On You
Confession
Immolation
My Way
The Purge
Odds And Lies
Ultimate Sin
Walk Away
Rat

External links

Metal Underground News
Tunescope News
Gazeta dos Artistas News
Premiere Music
Gazeta da beira Interview
Vents Magazine Interview
Article from La Estadea (Spain)
metalunderground
themetalreview
liveshows*bravewords
horrormetalsounds
muzikinjection

Portuguese heavy metal musical groups
Thrash metal musical groups
Musical quintets
Musical groups established in 2012
2012 establishments in Portugal